

The Lioré et Olivier LeO H-46 was a bomber seaplane built in France in 1936.

Development and design
The LeO H-46 was a twin-tail monoplane floatplane bomber of all-metal construction, powered by two Gnome-Rhône 14Knr radial engines of LH and RH rotation. The production aircraft would have been powered by  engines. The LeO H-46 was first flown in May 1936 by Lucien Bourdin. During flight testing in 1938 at l’Etang de Vaine, near Marseille the H-46 was badly damaged. Expensive lengthy repairs and changing priorities led to the cancellation of the program.

Specifications

References

Further reading
 
 

1930s French bomber aircraft
Floatplanes
H-046
Aircraft first flown in 1936